Jeremy "JD" Doyle (2 November 1983 – 18 December 2011) was an Australian wheelchair basketball player.  He became paraplegic due to being run over by a truck and competed in the 2009 Paralympic World Cup and the 2010 World Championship. He died of cancer in 2011 at the age of 28.

Early and personal life
Doyle was born on 19 November 1983. He became a paraplegic at the age of four after being struck by a car. He worked for ING in 2009. In 2009, Doyle was named a Don't DIS my ABILITY Ambassador.

At the 2010 New South Wales Institute of Sport Awards, he was honoured for his "Outstanding Achievement". In 2010, he was diagnosed with bladder cancer. In August 2011, while he was preparing for the 2012 London Paralympics, the cancer returned and he was diagnosed as terminally ill. On 2 December 2011, Doyle married Melanie Carr, whom he had met online in April 2011, at Campbelltown Hospital. He died from cancer on 18 December 2011 in Sydney, aged 28.

Career

Doyle was a basketball point guard and guard. He was classified as a 1 point player. He had a wheelchair basketball scholarship from the New South Wales Institute of Sport.  His basketball teammates nicknamed him JD. His jersey number was 14.

He was a member of the Australia men's national wheelchair basketball team, and made his team debut in 2009 at the Paralympic World Cup. He also competed at the 2010 Wheelchair Basketball World Championship. The team won a gold medal in both.

He competed at the 2009 IWBF Asia-Oceania Championship, where his team finished first. He was chosen to represent Australia at the 2012 Summer Paralympics.  His last appearance for the national team was at the 2011 Tri-Nations Series in Canberra, Australia, where he scored 8 points and had one assist in the 30 June match against the Netherlands.  At the time, he was coached by Ben Ettridge.

Doyle first played in the National Wheelchair Basketball League in 2007. He played for the Wenty Wheelkings, making his debut as a starter for the team in 2008.  In 2009, he was playing for the Sydney Wheelkings.

Doyle also played wheelchair hockey; he was a member of Australia's national team.  He played his club electric wheelchair hockey for the New South Wales team, the Hawks. As of December 2011, he is the league's leading scorer for the 2011/2012 season.

Doyle participated at the World Cyber Games in Counter-Strike, where he represented Australia in 2001 and again in 2006.

References

External links

 
 
 
 
 

Paralympic wheelchair basketball players of Australia
Deaths from bladder cancer
Place of birth missing
Sportsmen from New South Wales
People with paraplegia
Deaths from cancer in New South Wales
New South Wales Institute of Sport alumni
1983 births
2011 deaths